Judge Orr may refer to:

 Charles Prentiss Orr (1858–1922), judge of the United States District Court for the Western District of Pennsylvania
 William Edwin Orr (1881–1965), judge of the United States Court of Appeals for the Ninth Circuit

See also
 Justice Orr (disambiguation)